Condition Red is a 1995 Finnish-American thriller film directed by Mika Kaurismäki. The premise is that a correctional officer falls in love with a female inmate who convinces him to help her escape. It was entered into the 19th Moscow International Film Festival.

Cast
 James Russo as Dan Cappelli
 Cynda Williams as Gidell Ryan
 Paul Calderon as Angel Delgado
 Victor Argo as Victor Klein
 Jonathan Shaw as Tattooed Inmate
 Verrone Romeoletti as Malone
 Cedric Turner as Inmate
 Matthew Styles as Effeminate Inmate
 Richard Boes as Boyce
 Andre Degas as Bishop
 John Ashton as Deputy Warden
 Ana Ortiz as C Block Inmate
 Amanda Foster as Blondie

References

External links
 

1995 films
1995 drama films
1995 independent films
1990s prison drama films
1990s thriller drama films
American independent films
American thriller drama films
English-language Finnish films
Films directed by Mika Kaurismäki
Films set in the United States
Women in prison films
Finnish thriller drama films
1990s English-language films
1990s American films